Tiger Style is an American independent video game studio. The studio was founded by industry veterans Randy Smith and David Kalina in 2008. Their first title Spider: The Secret of Bryce Manor, was released in August 2009, followed by Waking Mars in 2012.  They are a fully independent collective of designers, artists, and musicians. The studio is known for working remotely, and is known for their cooperative pay structure, distributing royalties among the game production teams.

List of titles
Spider: The Secret of Bryce Manor (2009)
Waking Mars (2012)
Spider: Rite of the Shrouded Moon (2015)

References

Video game development companies
Video game companies established in 2008
Video game companies of the United States